Jamwon-dong is a dong, neighbourhood of the greater Gangnam area Seocho-gu in Seoul, South Korea. Until 1988, Jamwon-dong was under the jurisdiction of Gangnam-gu. Jamwon-dong is popular for its mulberry trees and silkworms, whose cocoon is used to make fabric for clothing. As a legal-status neighborhood, Jamwon-dong includes Banpo 3-dong and Jamwon-dong (administrative neighborhood).

Education 
 Middle Schools
 Shindong Middle School
 Kyongwon Middle School
 Elementary Schools
 Sindong Elementary School
 Banwon Elementary School

Transportation
 Jamwon station of 
 Sinsa station of 
 Banpo station of 
 Nonhyeon station of 
 Express Bus Terminal station of

See also 
Administrative divisions of South Korea

References

External links
Seocho-gu official website
Seocho-gu map at the Seocho-gu official website
 The Jamwon-dong Resident office

Neighbourhoods of Seocho District